Parvicapsulidae is a family of myxosporeans.

Genera
 Gadimyxa Køie, Karlsbakk & Nylund, 2007
 Neoparvicapsula Gayevskaya, Kovaljova & Schulman, 1982
 Parvicapsula Shulman, 1953

References

 
Cnidarian families
Animal parasites of fish
Variisporina